Slovak Church may refer to:

 Catholic Church in Slovakia, incorporating all communities and institutions of the Catholic Church in Slovakia
 Slovak Byzantine Catholic Church, an Eastern Catholic church of the Byzantine Rite, centered in Slovakia
 Czech and Slovak Orthodox Church, canonical branch of the Eastern Orthodox Church in Czech Republic and Slovakia
 Slovak Evangelical Church, evangelical church of the Augsburg Confession in Slovakia
 Slovak Old-Catholic Church, an Old Catholic Church in Slovakia

See also 
 Slovak Catholic Church